Holcocera paradoxa is a moth in the family Blastobasidae. It is found in Arizona, United States.

The larvae feed on the seeds and pods of Yucca  species, including Yucca schottii.

References

Moths described in 1976
paradoxa